Sherman Howard (born June 11, 1949) is an American actor. He is best known for his performance as the zombie Bub in George A. Romero's Day of the Dead (1985) and Lex Luthor on Superboy (1990–92). He also voiced Derek Powers (a.k.a. Blight) in Batman Beyond (1999–2001).

Theatre
Howard began his career at the American Conservatory Theater in San Francisco in 1971. While a member of ACT's repertory company, he appeared in the roles of Glendenning in David Storey's The Contractor, The Archangel Gabriel in Nagle Jackson's The Mystery Cycle, James in Harold Pinter's The Collection, and Gratiano in The Merchant of Venice, along with roles in both Antony and Cleopatra and Caesar and Cleopatra. He appeared as Archie in Tom Stoppard's Jumpers in the premiere season of Chicago's Northlight Theatre Company.

While a member of the resident company at the Actors Theatre of Louisville for three seasons during the mid-70s, he played the role of Lucius in Jon Jory's Andronicus: A Space Musical, and had roles in The Runner Stumbles, The Front Page, The Resistible Rise of Arturo Ui, and the European tour of Marsha Norman's Getting Out. His off-Broadway credits include Shel Silverstein's The Crate and The Lady or the Tiger Show as well as Sam Shepard's Geography of a Horse Dreamer at the Ensemble Studio Theatre, along with I'm Not Rappaport at the Roundabout Theatre Company. He appeared in Titus Andronicus and Tell Out My Soul at The Public Theater, and in Lillian Hellman's Another Part of the Forest at the Pecadillo Theatre. He most recently appeared in the title role of "Bauer" by Lauren Gunderson at 59 E 59th St in New York City.

His regional credits include Prospero in The Tempest, King Henry in The Lion in Winter, Spooner in No Man's Land, and Lopakhin in The Cherry Orchard at the Shakespeare Theatre of New Jersey (STNJ), where he has also appeared in the title roles of both Bertolt Brecht's Life of Galileo and Luigi Pirandello's Henry IV (Enrico IV). He also appeared as Scrooge in the STNJ's production of A Christmas Carol. He played the role of Benedick in Much Ado About Nothing, opposite his wife, Donna Bullock, as Beatrice. He played the title roles in both Hamlet and Macbeth at the Kentucky Shakespeare Festival and the North Carolina Shakespeare Festival, respectively. He appeared in the title role of Sheridan at the La Jolla Playhouse. He appeared in The Price at the Pittsburgh Public Theater and in Nine Armenians at the Intiman Theater in Seattle. His Broadway credits include Bengal Tiger at the Baghdad Zoo, All My Sons, Inherit the Wind, and Gore Vidal's The Best Man. He recently concluded a run at the Old Globe Theatre in San Diego as The Player in Tom Stoppard's Rosencrantz and Guildenstern Are Dead and appeared in "The Second Mrs. Wilson" at George Street Playhouse under the direction of Gordon Edelstein.

Howard also has a passion for concert hall music. In their 2013/14, season he performed with the Philadelphia Orchestra in Sergei Rachmaninoff's The Bells conducted by Vladimir Jurowski. He also appeared in the role of Prospero in the New Jersey Symphony Orchestra's presentation of Jean Sibelius' The Tempest Suite conducted by Jacque Lacombe. He has performed Richard Strauss's Enoch Arden with concert pianist David Kaplan at Bargemusic in Brooklyn and Metropolis Ensemble in Manhattan.

Personal life
Howard has been married to actress Donna Bullock since May 1988. They have one daughter, Hannah Sherman.

Filmography

Film

Television

Video Games

References

External links

1949 births
Living people
20th-century American male actors
21st-century American male actors
American male film actors
American male television actors
American male video game actors
American male voice actors
Male actors from Chicago